Andrew Byabashaija is a Ugandan lawyer and judge on the High Court of Uganda. He was appointed to that court by president Yoweri Museveni on 17 June 2010.

Background and education
He graduated from the Faculty of Law of Makerere University, Uganda's largest and oldest public university, with a Bachelor of Laws, circa 1986. The following year, he was awarded a Diploma in Legal Practice by the Law Development Centre, in Kampala, Uganda's capital city. He also holds a Master of Development Studies degree, also from Makerere University. His Doctor of Philosophy degree in business administration was obtained from the Washington International University, an online unaccredited institution based in the British Virgin Islands.

Career
Prior to his ascension to the bench, Bashaija was a senior partner in the law firm of Pearl Advocates & Solicitors. He also served as a senior lecturer at Kampala International University's School of Law and as an external examiner at the Law Development Centre. He was first appointed to the bench in 1992 as a Grade One Magistrate. Later, in 2000, he was promoted to the rank of Registrar.

At the High Court, Justice Andrew Bashaija is the head of the land division.

See also
Monica Mugenyi
Jane Kiggundu
Ministry of Justice and Constitutional Affairs (Uganda)

References

External links
Website of the Judiciary of Uganda

20th-century Ugandan judges
21st-century Ugandan judges
1963 births
Living people
Makerere University alumni
Law Development Centre alumni
People from Western Region, Uganda
Justices of the High Court of Uganda
Academic staff of the Law Development Centre
Academic staff of Kampala International University
People using unaccredited degrees